Osafune may refer to:

Osafune Station, a railway station in Setouchi, Okayama Prefecture, Japan
Osafune, Okayama, a former town in Okayama Prefecture, Japan

People with the surname
, Japanese footballer

Japanese-language surnames